The following are the national records in athletics in Venezuela maintained by its national athletics federation: Federación Venezolana de Atletismo (FVA).

Outdoor

Key to tables:

+ = en route to a longer distance

h = hand timing

A = affected by altitude

OT = oversized track (> 200m in circumference)

Men

Women

Indoor

Men

Women

Notes

References

External links
FVA official website

Venezuelan
Records
Athletics
Athletics